The Pequea Bridge can refer to more than one bridge spanning the Pequea Creek in Lancaster County, Pennsylvania.  The names reflect the official county designations for the bridge.

 Leaman's Place Covered Bridge, Pequea #4 Bridge 
 Neff's Mill Covered Bridge, Pequea #7 Bridge 
 Lime Valley Covered Bridge, Pequea #8 Bridge 
 Baumgardener's Covered Bridge, Pequea #10 Bridge
 Colemanville Covered Bridge, Pequea #12 Bridge